Agelasida is an order of sea sponges in the class Demospongiae.

References

External links 
 

 
Sponge orders